Shujalpur Assembly constituency is one of the 230 Vidhan Sabha (Legislative Assembly) constituencies of Madhya Pradesh state in central India.

It is part of Shajapur District.

See also
 Shujalpur

References

Assembly constituencies of Madhya Pradesh